Dotyville is an unincorporated community located in the town of Forest, Fond du Lac County, Wisconsin, United States. The community was named for James Duane Doty, the first person to represent Wisconsin's third congressional district after statehood and Governor of the Utah Territory during the American Civil War.

Notes

Unincorporated communities in Fond du Lac County, Wisconsin
Unincorporated communities in Wisconsin